El Alma Joven Vol.III (English: The Young Soul Volume III) is the third studio album by Juan Gabriel, released in 1973. The album was recorded in Paris, France with the Paul Mauriat Orchestra.

Track listing

References 

1973 albums
Juan Gabriel albums
RCA Records albums